Kraken 25 was a day racing trimaran sailboat designed by Lock Crowther in the wake of his successful Bunyip 20 design.

Advertised as "Virtually a C Class trimaran of unbelievable light weather performance and good heavy weather performance [...] the trimaran for racing enthusiasts who want to show up the local catamarans".

See also
List of multihulls
Lock Crowther
Kraken 18
Kraken 33
Kraken 40

References

External links
1962 Kraken 25 restoration/rebuild project (updated 25 Jan 2015)
Kraken

Trimarans
Boats designed by Lock Crowther